Braintree Campus, formerly known as Braintree College, is a further education college based in Braintree, Essex. It is a constituent college of Colchester Institute.

The college was originally an independently controlled institution, but merged with Colchester Institute on 29 February 2010. Braintree Campus is Colchester Institute's second largest facility.

Courses offered focus on skills priority areas for Essex. These include Technology, Engineering, Construction, Business and Media.

The £5.6m Science, Technology, Engineering and Maths (STEM) Innovation Centre opened in September 2017 and features high-tech workshops, replica industrial facilities and state-of-the-art equipment. The centre provides training opportunities in construction and trades, engineering processes, digital media and manufacturing.

Opened in 2019 the Learning and Technology Centre focuses on high-tech IT and digital media facilities including new workshops, computer suites and virtual reality headsets.

Notable alumni
 Grayson Perry, Turner Prize winning artist
 Jeremy Spake, TV personality
 Lisa Harvey-Smith, Astronomer
 Olly Murs, singer
 Missing Andy, Band

References

External links
 Official website

Braintree, Essex
Further education colleges in Essex